Bhakton Ki Bhakti Mein Shakti is an Indian drama television series which ran for one season on Life OK in 2016. Saurabh Raj Jain played the lead role.

Cast 
 Saurabh Raj Jain as Host
 Mouli Ganguly as Shivangi (Episode 2)
 Mazher Sayed as Inspector Mannu (Episode 2)
 Neetha Shetty as Rishika (Episode 1)
 Sachin Shroff as Rishika's Husband (Episode 1)
 Vaishnavi Dhanraj as Aditi (Episode 17)
 Vishal Watwani as Tejas (Episode 20)
 Kajal Jain as Maithili (Episode 29)
 Manoj Chandila as Girish (Episode 9)
 Vaishali Takkar as Shraddha (Episode 19)
 Debina Bonnerjee as Inspector Shyama Ganguly (Episode 26)
 Nayan Bhatt as Kasturi (Episode 1)
 Gauri Singh as Head of News Channel (Episode 3)
 Shahab Khan as Mr. Sethi (Episode 3)
 Shweta Gautam as Raj's Elder Brother's Wife (Episode 4)
 Bhavesh Balchandani as Mannu (Episode 11)
 Fahad Ali as Sagar (Episode 15)
 Mehul Kajaria as Anil (Episode 24)

References

External links
 

Indian television series
Indian television soap operas
Serial drama television series
2016 Indian television series debuts
Life OK original programming
2016 Indian television series endings
Hindi-language television shows
Indian drama television series